The Philadelphia Phillies are a Major League Baseball team based in Philadelphia, Pennsylvania. They  are a member of the Eastern Division of Major League Baseball's National League. The team has played officially under two names since beginning play in 1883: the current moniker, as well as the "Quakers", which was used in conjunction with "Phillies" during the team's early history. The team was also known unofficially as the "Blue Jays" during the World War II era. Since the franchise's inception,  players have made an appearance in a competitive game for the team, whether as an offensive player (batting and baserunning) or a defensive player (fielding, pitching, or both).

Of those  Phillies, 180 have had surnames beginning with the letter B. Four of those players have been inducted into the Baseball Hall of Fame: Dave Bancroft, who played six seasons at shortstop for Philadelphia; Chief Bender, a pitcher with the team for two years; Dan Brouthers, whose career with the Phillies encompassed the 1896 season; and Jim Bunning, the pitcher whose number 14 is the only one retired by the Phillies for a player on this list. Of the four, Bancroft is the only one inducted to the Hall of Fame with the Phillies as his primary team. Bunning and Bender are two of four members of the Philadelphia Baseball Wall of Fame on this list, although Bender was inducted as a member of the Philadelphia Athletics; the others are catcher Bob Boone and shortstop Larry Bowa.

Among the 95 batters in this list, catcher Mack Burk has the highest batting average, at .500; he had one hit in two career plate appearances with Philadelphia. Other players with an average at or above .300 include Henry Baldwin (.313 in one season), Johnny Bates (.301 in two seasons), Beals Becker (.301 in three seasons), Wally Berger (.317 in one season), T. J. Bohn (.400 in one season), Brouthers (.344 in one season), George Browne (.300 in three seasons), Frank Bruggy (.310 in one season), and Smoky Burgess (.316 in four seasons). Pat Burrell leads Phillies players whose names begin with B in home runs, with 251, and runs batted in, with 827.

Of this list's 85 pitchers, Doug Bair and Doug Bird share the best winning percentage with Mark Brownson. Each is undefeated in his decisions—Bair and Bird with 2–0 records, and Brownson at 1–0. The top winner among pitchers whose names begin with B is Bunning, who recorded 89 victories in 6 seasons with Philadelphia. Ray Benge lost 82 games in 6 seasons, the most among these pitchers. Bunning's 1,409 strikeouts are the highest total among B pitchers, and two pitchers (Joe Bisenius and Dan Boitano) share the earned run average (ERA) lead, with a 0.00 mark; among pitchers who have allowed a run, Stan Bahnsen's 1.35 ERA is best. Bunning is one of the ten Phillies pitchers who have thrown a no-hitter, having pitched a perfect game on June 21, 1964.

Footnotes
Key
 The National Baseball Hall of Fame and Museum determines which cap a player wears on their plaque, signifying "the team with which he made his most indelible mark". The Hall of Fame considers the player's wishes in making their decision, but the Hall makes the final decision as "it is important that the logo be emblematic of the historical accomplishments of that player's career".
 Players are listed at a position if they appeared in 30% of their games or more during their Phillies career, as defined by Baseball-Reference.com. Additional positions may be shown on the Baseball-Reference website by following each player's citation.
 Franchise batting and pitching leaders are drawn from Baseball-Reference.com. A total of 1,500 plate appearances are needed to qualify for batting records, and 500 innings pitched or 50 decisions are required to qualify for pitching records.
 Statistics are correct as of the end of the 2010 Major League Baseball season.

List
 Howie Bedell is listed by Baseball-Reference as a left fielder, but never appeared in a game in the field for the Phillies.

References
General

Inline citations

B